In the Garden is an extended play by English rock band The Eighties Matchbox B-Line Disaster. Released in 2007, it was the band's first release since Andy Huxley departed the band and was replaced by Rich Fownes in 2005. A 15-venue tour took place between July and August 2007 to promote the EP.

The digital format of the EP was released on 23 July 2007, with the hard copy planned to be released a week later on 30 July with a bonus ten-track live album and fold-out ouija board. However, due to unforeseen circumstances, the hard copy release was pushed back to 3 September.

Track listing
"In the Garden" (Diamontopoulo & TEMBD) - 2:32
"You Say You're The Doctor But I Know You're The Mister" (Gharial & McKnight & TEMBD) - 2:40
"Terrible Night" (Diamontopoulo & TEMBD) - 2:49
"Horses Can Swim" (Norris & Fownes & TEMBD) - 2:13

CD2: "Live in the Arena of the Unwell" track listing
"Alex" - 2:50
"Team Meat" - 3:05
"Torrential Abuse" - 3:08
"Alchemy" - 4:00
"Turkish Delights of the Devil" - 3:08
"Clonk Chicane" - 2:39
"Ice Cream" - 2:35
"Flag Party" - 3:13
"Return December" - 2:13
"Charge the Guns" - 1:59
Clonk Chicane is misspelt throughout the CD's artwork – as Clonk Chichane on the tray inlay and Clonc Chicane on the CD.

Personnel
Guy McKnight – vocals
Marc Norris – guitars
Rich Fownes – guitars
Sym Gharial – bass
Tom Diamantopoulo – drums

Cover
The front cover of the EP shows four images, depicting each of the songs featured on the EP:
The top right image shows an apple wrapped with a snake, depicting the story of Adam and Eve, the theme of "In The Garden".
The bottom right picture shows a half horse, half fish-like creature, referring to the track "Horses Can Swim".
The bottom left picture shows the Rod of Asclepius, an ancient Greek symbol associated with healing the sick with medicine, referring to "You Say You're The Doctor But I Know You're The Mister".
The top left image shows a torch and a sword referring to the track "Terrible Night".

References

External links

"In The Garden" Download Site
"In The Garden" on Play.com

2007 debut EPs
The Eighties Matchbox B-Line Disaster albums